Reza Latif is a Bangladeshi film director, producer, and cinematographer. He won Bangladesh National Film Award for Best Cinematography of the films Ononto Prem (1977) and Goriber Bou (1990). He has made 150 films since the early 1970s.

Career
Latif first worked in the 1971 film Nacher Putul.

Latif made his directorial debut in 2010 by the film Ma Babar Shopno. His last directed film was Bhalobashar Shesh Nai.

Works
Producer
 Chitkar (1984)
 Chotobou
 Attarakkha
 Atongkito Shotru
Director
 Ma Babar Shopno (2010)
 Bhalobashar Shesh Nai

References

External links
 

Living people
Bangladeshi film directors
Bangladeshi film producers
Bangladeshi cinematographers
Best Cinematographer National Film Award (Bangladesh) winners
Year of birth missing (living people)